Old Castle Hall was the first building of Baker University in Baldwin City, Kansas.  It was built in 1857-58 to house the university on its first two floors, with the Palmyra Masonic Lodge occupying the third floor. It was used for classes until 1871, when other buildings were constructed for the purpose, and later used as a mill, a dormitory and for storage. The third floor was rebuilt during its service as a mill to address structural problems.

The building was restored in the 1950s and maintained as the Old Castle Museum. The museum features artifacts from early state, Methodist, and University history.

The hall is of rubble stone construction with crude quoining at the corners. The reconstruction of the third floor is visible by the change in material pattern on the outside. The overall plan is a rectangle. The interior has been extensively altered.

Old Castle Hall was listed on the National Register of Historic Places on February 24, 1971.

References

External links
 Old Castle Museum - official site at Baker University

University and college buildings on the National Register of Historic Places in Kansas
Buildings and structures completed in 1858
Buildings and structures in Douglas County, Kansas
Historic American Buildings Survey in Kansas
Baker University
Museums in Douglas County, Kansas
History museums in Kansas
University museums in Kansas
National Register of Historic Places in Douglas County, Kansas